K.C. Das Grandson Pvt. Ltd. is an Indian confectionery famous for its sweet and snacks. It is especially known for the white spongy form of rossogolla in Bengal, invented by the founder's ancestor, Nobin Chandra Das.

History 
For details see Birth of Rossogolla

During 1868, Nobin Chandra Das, who belonged to Kolkata, experimentally developed the first Rossogolla.  Subsequently, K.C. Das, who was Nobin Das's son began to can the rasgulla which resulted in the widespread availability of the sweets. His son, Sarada Charan Das, incorporated and established the family enterprise as K.C.Das Private Limited and was primarily responsible for driving the explosive growth in business. In 1955, Sarada Charan had a major disagreement with his second son, Debendra Nath Das, which led to a permanent estrangement within the family. Debendra Nath Das chose to step out of the family and established his own Indian confectionery store in Kalighat , naming it as "K. C. Das Grandson" after his late grandfather.

Exports 
K.C. Das Grandson's products are not only used widely in Bengal, but also exported to many countries like UK, United States, Bangladesh.

References 

Confectioners
Companies based in Kolkata
Confectionery companies of India
1956 establishments in West Bengal
Food and drink companies established in 1956
Indian companies established in 1956